JSGI, or JavaScript Gateway Interface, is an interface between web servers and JavaScript-based web applications and frameworks. It was inspired by the Rack for Ruby and WSGI for Python and was one of the inspirations of PSGI for Perl.

 is a reference implementation of JSGI.

It has been included in and further developed by the CommonJS project.

JSGI packages 
All these packages are for Node.JS.

Low level 
 Q-IO: Promise-based I/O, includes JSGI based HTTP server and client
 jsgi-node: Low level JSGI interface for Node.JS

Framework 
These frameworks allow using promises with Q:
 
 

The names are inspired by Sinatra.

References

External links 
 JSGI 0.3 specification
 
 

JavaScript libraries